Santana is an American rock band, formed in 1967 in San Francisco by singer and guitarist Carlos Santana, who has been the band's leader throughout its career. The band has won a number of awards, including eight Grammy Awards and three Latin Grammy Awards, largely recognizing 1999's album Supernatural and the single "Smooth". The band was inducted into the Rock and Roll Hall of Fame in 1998, and Santana's works have entered the Grammy Hall of Fame and Latin Grammy Hall of Fame.

The band released its self-titled debut album in 1969. During 1973, Santana received its first nomination for a major award when its fourth album Caravanserai (1972) was nominated for the Grammy Award for Best Pop Instrumental Performance with Vocal Coloring. The band was nominated for further Grammys in 1993 and 1996. In 2000, following the success of the previous year's album Supernatural, the band was nominated for nine Grammys and won eight, tying the record held by Michael Jackson for the most awards at a single Grammy ceremony. The album won the awards for Album of the Year and Best Rock Album and the single "Smooth" received two Grammys for Record of the Year and Best Pop Collaboration with Vocals. Four other songs from the album also won Grammys. In the same year, the band received three awards at the Latin Grammy Awards, including Record of the Year.

Santana has sold more than 100 million records to date. The band's best-selling album to date is Supernatural, which has sold over 30 million copies worldwide. According to the Guinness Book of World Records, Supernatural is the best-selling album of all time by a Latin artist.

Awards and nominations

Notes

References

External links
 

Santana
Awards